World of Demons is a 2021 hack and slash premium mobile game developed by PlatinumGames. The player plays as a samurai who controls yōkai to fight against oni. The game was released on April 2, 2021 through Apple Arcade.

Gameplay 
World of Demons is broken up into individual chapters, in which the player completes combat challenges and puzzles to progress. The player can collect Yōkai through gameplay, which each have different attacks. The game has four playable samurai, who have unique weapons. Both Yōkai and weapons can be upgraded through two currencies earned through gameplay, gold and gems.

Each character can use spirits called Yōkai who fight alongside the player in combat. The samurai can perform different attacks based on how fast they tap on the touchscreen, and how long they hold between taps. Players can use different moves together to perform combos. World of Demons has a bullet time mechanic, where if the player dodges right before an enemy attack, time slows down and allows the player to get additional hits in.

Development 
World of Demons was announced in April 2018 as a partnership between PlatinumGames and DeNA, and was set to release later the same year as a free-to-play experience. The game soft-launched on iOS in June 2018 in Malaysia, Singapore and the Philippines. The game was not updated after its launch, and was removed from the App Store in September 2018, leading some to think the game was canceled. 

The final game was entirely redesigned from the soft-launch. Apart from the graphics and concept, nothing in World of Demons is the same as the 2018 release. PlatinumGames studio head Atsushi Inaba stated that "it is a completely different game. We had the opportunity to release the game for Apple Arcade, and instead of just making a few small adjustments for the new platform, we decided to take this opportunity to rebuild the game from the ground up." Inaba stated one of the inspirations for the game was Hyakki Yagyō, a Japanese folktale.

The game was released on April 2, 2021 through Apple Arcade on iOS and macOS.

Reception 

World of Demons received positive reviews from critics, ending up with a score of 76 on Metacritic. Critics praised the art style and the combat, but criticized the gameplay as being repetitive.

GameSpot Jason Fanelli praised the versatility of the combat system, "Mixing Onimaru's sword attacks in with the supporting yokai gives you plenty of options in combat, encouraging strategizing before every enemy... It's fast and it's frantic, but most importantly, it's a lot of fun, emulating that signature Platinum Games style impressively well." He criticized the lack of variety in the mission structure, "missions can sometimes feel repetitive, with the game's only variety being found in the yokai that appear during battles... There's some exploration thrown in, but the bulk of each chapter follows this exact same structure, and after a few extended gameplay sessions, it starts to feel a little stale."

CJ Andriessen of Destructoid liked World of Demons use of touchscreen controls despite some criticisms, writing "With so many attack possibilities, I have to hand it to PlatinumGames for getting the touchscreen controls as good as it did. Make no mistake, this game is best played with a controller, but everyone should be able to hold their own without one. The biggest issues I faced with touch controls are World of Demons slow camera controls and unreliable auto-target system. Thankfully, I was usually able to overcome the latter with deft usage of the dodge button." He criticized the game for still feeling like a mobile game in its pacing. "It's probably best to treat the game as if it were still a free-to-play title and back off it if you ever start to feel the gameplay growing tedious. It's certainly fun, but with the amount of grinding you need to do to level up your various weapons and minions, it's more bite-sized fun rather than sink-your-whole-weekend-into-it fun."

References

External links
 

2021 video games
Action video games
Apple Arcade games
Hack and slash games
IOS games
MacOS games
PlatinumGames games
Video games about demons
Video games about samurai
Video games based on Japanese mythology
Video games developed in Japan
Video games set in feudal Japan